Jozi FM (formerly known as Soweto Buwa Radio)  is a local radio station that started in 1995 as Soweto Community Radio.
In 1999–2000, Soweto Community Radio and Buwa Radio merged to form Jozi FM, to form the largest community radio station in South Africa, broadcasting in several languages including: English, isiZulu, Sesotho, Sepedi, Setswana and Xitsonga. The station's radio format is 50 percent music and 50 percent discussion. The studios are based at Khaya Centre in Dube, Soweto in South Africa and covers regions all across Soweto, Kagiso, Lenasia, Krugersdorp, Randfontein, Kempton Park, Germiston and Alberton.

Jozi FM was first broadcast in 1999 and can claim a competitive audience of 564,000 (RAMS Nov 2009). Jozi FM is the first community radio station to be listed on the DSTV's audio bouquet.

Jozi FM attributes its success to the relationship it has with its audience. The radio station is a voice for the surrounding communities and focuses on delivering on the demands of its listeners. The subject matters range from education, information and fun and entertainment. Being a community radio station is not only a geographical aspect but entails responsibility to the community in terms of advertising, sales and marketing to grow local businesses using radio as a medium.

History

As a community radio station, Jozi fm was expected to fail from the on set. Many were skeptical about the lack and insufficiency of reliable equipment and the station battled to secure a loyal listenership. The station was involved in numerous scandals which included fired deejays and numerous changes of station managers. various deejays such as the late Fana Khaba, Penny Lebyane, Zanele Magoso-Luhabe and Mapaseka Makoti launched their careers at the station, not to mention Phindi Gule, Patrick Guma, Khanyi Mkhonza, Vusi Langa, Hlengiwe Mabaso, Nyakalo Leine, Christ Matshaba, Owatile Jacobs, Siphiwe Mtshali, Papa Moalusi and Khumbuzile Thabethe.

Roughly 80 percent of the deejays moved on to join bigger stations such as Kaya FM, Metro FM, Motsweding FM, Lesedi FM, SAFM and YFM and East Coast Radio. Among the few that remained include Dudu Gama, Andrew Tshaka and Rich Twala. The station continued to be the main DJ provider for many radio stations in Gauteng, Free State and North West.

Jozi FM was involved in a dispute regarding management and control of the radio station by various groups, which accounted for the skepticism surrounding management and board. The issue of contracts became a recurring one and programme managers were often accused of nepotism.

Target audience

Although Jozi FM is a community radio station, it broadcasts nationwide, allowing for a more diversified audience range. The radio station targets a working-class, multi-cultural and educated audience.

Line-up

 Late Night Affair
 Youth Connection
 Angels of The Morning
 Morning Cruise
 The Discussion With...
 Imvelaphi
 Ghetto Radio
 Mid Morning Chat
 Big Breakfast Show

Line-up

 Lungile Masondo
 Zama Mncwango
 Andrew Tshaka
 Lucky Moeletsi
 Refiloe Motsei
 Fino
 Aphelele
 Mangethe
Iminam Tatiya

Listenership Figures

References

External links 
 http://www.jozifm.co.za
 https://web.archive.org/web/20110928222923/http://www.laurahird.com/newreview/khabzela.html
 http://www.tvsa.co.za › Actors
 http://www.sowetanlive.co.za/sowetan/archive/2008/01/02/jozi-fm_s-amazing-rise
 https://web.archive.org/web/20101017045008/http://www.themediaconnection.co.za/JoziFM.htm
 http://www.sowetanlive.co.za/sowetan/archive/.../jozi-fm_s-amazing-rise
 https://voiceovers.mandy.com/view.php?uid=193598
SAARF Website
Sentech Website

Radio stations in Johannesburg
Community radio stations in South Africa